Lašva is a village in the City of Zenica, Bosnia and Herzegovina. It is located at the draining of the Lašva into the Bosna river.

Demographics 
According to the 2013 census, its population was 438.

References

Populated places in Zenica